Jeanette Kagame

Louise Mushikiwabo

Rosemary Museminali

References

Rwanda